1920 Polish Football Championship was the 1st edition of the Polish Football Championship (Non-League). Abandoned due to the Polish–Soviet War. Winners of five regional groups were to meet in the final tournament.

Regional A-Classes tournaments

Cracovian Group

Final table

Lvovian Group
Only two matches played: Pogoń Lwów vs. Czarni Lwów 3–1 and Czarni Lwów vs. Polonia Przemyśl 6–0. Rewera Stanisławów played no match. Games not finished.

Lodzian Group
No matches played. Teams entered: ŁKS, Klub Turystów, ŁTSG and (ŁTG) Szturm, all from Łódź.

Posnanian Group
Games not finished.

Varsovian Group
No matches played. Teams entered: Polonia Warsaw and Korona Warsaw.

Final tournament table
Games not started.

References

Bibliography

External links
 Poland – List of final tables at RSSSF 
 List of Polish football championships 
 List of Polish football championships 

Polish Football Championship, 1920
Polish Football Championship, 1920
Polish
Polish
Seasons in Polish football competitions